The Presidents of the United States of America is the debut studio album by the American alternative rock band The Presidents of the United States of America, released on March 10, 1995 via PopLlama Records. Columbia Records signed the band shortly after its release to handle increased distribution for the album.

Released during the grunge and punk music breakthrough-era, the album produced four singles—"Kitty", "Lump", "Peaches" and "Dune Buggy"—that helped the group gain mainstream popularity, and "Lump" can be found on the band's 2000 compilation album with the same title. The Presidents of the United States of America received positive reviews, and has been certified triple Platinum by the RIAA.

Background and recording
Chris Ballew and Dave Dederer met while attending The Bush School in Seattle. In the 1980s and early 1990s they collaborated on various musical projects.  Ballew returned to Seattle in the summer of 1993, and he and Dederer formed what would become The Presidents of the United States of America that autumn.  Initially a drummerless duo, they performed a half-dozen or so shows in late 1993 as "The Lo-Fis", "The Dynamic Duo", and "Pure Frosting." Ballew eventually came upon the name "The Presidents of the United States of America." Shortly after settling on their name, Ballew and Dederer added drummer Jason Finn. In early December 1993, the band played their first show as a trio at The Romper Room in Seattle. At the time, Finn was also the drummer in the band Love Battery, who had recently changed record labels from Sub Pop to Atlas Records, an A&M subsidiary.

In early 1994, The Presidents recorded a 10-song cassette, Froggystyle, at Laundry Room Studios. The band sold the cassette at shows in 1994. Finn also sold the cassette from behind the bar of Seattle's legendary Comet Tavern, where he tended bar.

In 1994, the Presidents signed with the tiny Seattle label PopLlama Records and released their self-titled debut in the following year, featuring several remixed tracks from Froggystyle. The band also released a limited edition blue vinyl 7" single, "Fuck California", on C/Z Records. Columbia Records signed the band shortly thereafter and re-released the album in late July 1995. Driven by the singles "Lump", "Peaches", and "Kitty", their debut album proved to be a smash, eventually selling over three million copies.

Composition
Critics praised the band's catchy, humorous, and self-deprecating songs, which were a major departure from the grunge/post-grunge sound present on the airwaves. The album received Grammy nominations in 1995 and 1996.  Though "Peaches" met the most critical success, the band credits "Lump" as their favorite single. The song's strange lyrics came from a dream that Ballew had while fighting pneumonia. The antibiotics he was taking caused an allergic reaction that produced several consecutive nights of wild and crazy dreams. The lyrics for "Peaches" were written about a crush Ballew used to have on a girl. According to him, she had a peach tree in the front of her yard, and when he finally summoned the courage to go talk to her, he stood under the tree and smashed peaches in his fist until he decided not to talk to her.

Packaging and release
Originally, the album was released in March 1995 on the independent Seattle label, PopLlama Records. This version of the album was noticeably different than other subsequent releases. The inside cover featured a picture of the band with Bill Clinton, who was the president of the United States at the time. The CD looked like a food inspection stamp. "Feather Pluckn" included a verse which was an homage of the Beatles' "I've Got a Feeling". The PopLlama release was also pressed on yellow vinyl with two bonus tracks. After the band signed to Columbia Records, the album was re-released on July 25, 1995. This version's inside cover featured a picture of the band members painted in red, white and blue in multiple pictures. The CD looks like a vinyl record label. All of the songs were re-mixed, and "Feather Pluckn" lost the "I've Got a Feeling" verse. In 2004, the band independently re-released the album as a Ten Year Super Bonus Special Anniversary Edition. It featured 13 bonus tracks, including B-sides and demos, and a bonus DVD of music videos and performance footage. In 2008, the album was re-released for a final time by the band's current label, Fugitive Recordings. This version features the food inspection stamp-like design that originally appeared on the 1995 edition. The insert picture features a collage of band performances. In addition, the liner notes were slightly updated.

In February 2020, the group announced a vinyl reissue via Kickstarter.

Reception

Commercial performance
The Presidents of the United States of America peaked at number six on the Billboard 200. As of 1997, the album has shipped over three million copies and has been certified triple platinum.

Critical reception

Critical reception to The Presidents of the United States of America was mostly positive. Johnny Loftus of AllMusic retrospectively wrote that "their quirky take on punk-pop did help expand the palette of MTV and alternative radio, and make their oddball singles part of the enduring sound of the era."

Legacy and influence
 "Boll Weevil" was featured in the 1995 film Ace Ventura: When Nature Calls.
 "Lump" was featured in the 2009 film Fanboys.
 "Weird Al" Yankovic released a parody version of "Lump" known as "Gump", a humorous tribute to Forrest Gump. The group liked Yankovic's version so much that they ended their own performances of "Lump" with Yankovic's line "And that's all I have to say about that" between 1996 and their dissolution in 2015.
 Bob Rivers also recorded a parody of "Lump" entitled "Plump".
 Canadian ska punk band The Johnstones covered "Lump" on their 2008 EP SEX.
 Accordionist Duckmandu (Jason Seeman) covered "Lump" on his compilation album Quack Rock: Five Duckades of Accordion Mega-Hits.
 "Peaches" was parodied in the TV series Bill Nye the Science Guy as "Farm Foods", with lead singer Chris Ballew playing basitar in the parody.
 In the King of the Hill episode "Next of Shin", somebody asks Hank Hill about peaches. Thinking he is referring to the song, Hank takes out his guitar and sings the song's chorus.
 British electronica duo Lemon Jelly heavily sampled the opening riffs of "Peaches" played in reverse as well as the lines "Yeah, yeah" and "Millions of peaches, peaches for me, millions of peaches, peaches for free" in their song "The Fruity Track".

Track listing

Ten Year Super Bonus Special Anniversary Edition bonus tracks

14-17 also appear on various editions of the "Peaches" single.  20-24 and 26 are performed entirely by Chris Ballew.
Ten Year Super Bonus Special Anniversary Edition Super Bonus Thrillpack DVD

The DVD also includes a commentary track by the band.

Personnel
The Presidents of the United States of America
Chris Ballew – vocals, two-string basitar
Dave Dederer – three-string guitbass, vocals
Jason Finn – no-string drums, backing vocals

Additional musician
Kim Thayil – guitar on "Naked and Famous"

Technical (PopLlama edition)
Conrad Uno – co-producer, engineer (tracks 2–4, 6–9, 11–12), mastering
Chris Ballew – co-producer
Dave Dederer – co-producer, front cover photo
Barrett Jones – engineer (tracks 1, 5, 10, 13)
Pete Gerrald – mastering 
Mark Guenther – second engineer
Art Chantry – design
San Pacific International – sculptures
Lance Mercer – back cover photo

Additional technical credits (Columbia edition)
David Kahne – mixing (tracks 3–4, 6, 8, 10–11, 13)
Steve Culp – mix engineer (tracks 3–4, 6, 8, 10–11, 13)
Wally Traugott – mastering
Doug Erb – design update
Marty Temme – tray card photo

Charts

Weekly charts

Year-end charts

Certifications

Release history

References

External links
 (album)

The Presidents of the United States of America (band) albums
Columbia Records albums
PopLlama Records albums
1995 debut albums
Albums produced by Conrad Uno